Edmund Braye, 1st Baron Braye (or Bray; c. 1484 – 18 October 1539), of Eaton Bray in Bedfordshire, was an English peer.

Origins

He was the son of John Braye lord of the manor of Eaton Bray in Bedfordshire; his younger brother was Sir Edward Braye.  He inherited a large portion of the property of his uncle, Sir Reginald Bray, which was confirmed by a deed of settlement made between himself and William Sandys, 1st Baron Sandys and his wife Margery, "in adjustment of a dispute between the parties regarding the lands of the deceased".

Career
He served as Sheriff of Bedfordshire for 1514 and as Sheriff of Sussex and Surrey in 1522. He was knighted in 1513 and, in 1529, he was summoned by writ to the House of Lords as Baron Braye, "of Eaton Bray in the County of Bedford". 

The feudal barony of Eaton had been an ancient feudal barony seated at Eaton Castle. The manor of Eaton obtained the postscript "Bray" following his ownership, to distinguish it from other similarly named places. He was one of the Bedfordshire contingent in attendance on King Henry VIII when he met King Francois I of France at the Field of the Cloth of Gold in June 1520.

Marriage and children
He married Jane Halwell (d. 24 Oct 1558) (alias Halgawell, Halliwell, Haleighwell, etc.), daughter and heiress of Sir Richard Halwell of Halwell near Harberton in Devon, by his wife Jane Norbury,
daughter and heiress of John Norbury of Stoke d'Abernon in Surrey, (eldest son of Henry Norbury (d.1415) of Hoddesdon and Little Berkhamsted in Hertfordshire, a Member of Parliament for Bedfordshire in 1454 and 1454) the arms of which families were quartered by his descendants. By his wife he had issue one son and six daughters, as follows:
John Braye, 2nd Baron Braye (d. 1557), eldest son and heir, who died childless when his heirs became his six sisters;
Anne Bray (Lady Cobham), eldest daughter, who married George Brooke, 9th Baron Cobham (c1497 - 29 Sept 1558), lord of the manor of Cobham, Kent; her alabaster recumbent effigy survives, together with that of her husband, on their magnificent monument in St Mary Magdalene's Church, Cobham;
Elizabeth Bray (d.1573), second daughter, who married Sir Ralph Verney (1509–1546), of Pendley in Tring, Hertfordshire, and of Middle Claydon, Buckinghamshire, whose monumental brasses with heraldic shields survive in the Church of St. John the Baptist, Aldbury, Hertfordshire. On her robe are engraved the arms of Verney (quarterly of four) impaling Bray (quarterly of four: 1&4: Bray modern; 2&3: Bray ancient, all charged with an inescutcheon of pretence of four-quarters: 1: Or, on a bend gules three goats argent (Hallighwell); 2: Sable, a chevron between three bull's heads cabossed argent (Norbury); 3: Gules, a fess chequy argent and sable between six crosslets formée fitchée argent (Boteler); 4: Or, two bends gules (Sudeley). She married secondly to Richard Catesby. Her sons included:
Edmund Verney (1528–58), of Pendley, eldest son and heir, twice MP for Buckinghamshire;
Francis Verney (1531/4-1559), of Salden in Mursley, Buckinghamshire, 4th son, also twice MP for Buckinghamshire;
Frideswide Bray, who married Sir Percyval Hart, chief sewer and knight harbinger to King Henry VIII;
Mary Bray, who married George Peckham;
Dorothy Bray (c.1524-1605) (Lady Chandos), youngest daughter, who married Edmund Brydges, 2nd Baron Chandos. She served as a Maid of Honour to three queens consort of King Henry VIII, namely Anne of Cleves, Catherine Howard and Catherine Parr.
Frances Bray, who married Thomas Lefeild.

Death and burial
He died in October 1539 and was succeeded in the barony by his son John Braye, 2nd Baron Braye (d. 1557).

References

Sources
Kidd, Charles, Williamson, David (editors). Debrett's Peerage and Baronetage (1990 edition). New York: St Martin's Press, 1990.

1480s births
1539 deaths
01
Year of birth uncertain
16th-century English nobility
High Sheriffs of Bedfordshire
High Sheriffs of Buckinghamshire
High Sheriffs of Surrey
High Sheriffs of Sussex